Koin, Guinea (Pular: 𞤂𞤫𞤧-𞤯𞤢𞤤𞤭𞥅𞤪𞤫 𞤑𞤮𞤴𞤭𞤲)  is a town and sub-prefecture in the Tougué Prefecture in the Labé Region of northern-central Guinea.
The town has a total area of about 0,964 square kilometers or 0,372 square miles. Koin was one of the nine Diiwe (provinces) of the theocratic Kingdom of Fuuta Jaloo.

References

Sub-prefectures of the Labé Region